Alejandra Zaga Mendez (1987/88 in Lima, Peru) is a Canadian politician, who was elected to the National Assembly of Quebec in the 2022 Quebec general election. She represents the riding of Verdun as a member of Québec solidaire.

Early life
Zaga Mendez emigrated to Canada from Peru when she was fourteen. She first became involved in politics as a result of the 2008 shooting of Fredy Villanueva, and participated in the 2012 Quebec student protests on the campus of McGill University.

She has a master's degree in natural resource management from McGill University and a doctorate in sustainable development from Université du Québec en Outaouais.

Electoral record

References

External links
Official site at the National Assembly of Quebec

21st-century Canadian politicians
21st-century Canadian women politicians
Québec solidaire MNAs
Women MNAs in Quebec
Living people
People from Verdun, Quebec
Politicians from Montreal
McGill University alumni
Peruvian emigrants to Canada
Université du Québec en Outaouais alumni
Year of birth missing (living people)